This is a timeline of the Qing dynasty (1636–1912).

Background

16th century

1580s

1590s

17th century

1600s

1610s

1620s

1630s

17th century

1630s

1640s

1650s

1660s

1670s

1680s

1690s

18th century

1720s

1730s

1740s

1750s

1760s

1770s

1780s

19th century

1820s

1840s

1860s

1870s

1890s

20th century

1900s

Gallery

References

Bibliography
 

 .

 (alk. paper) 
 

 

 .

 

 
  (paperback).
 
 
 
 

 
 .
 .

 

 
 

 

 
 
 
 

 

 

 .

 

 
 .
 

  
 

 
 

 

Qing